Fórmula Truck is a Brazilian Truck racing series. It ran from 1996 to 2017, when it folded and was reorganized into the Copa Truck. However, the series returned to its original name and format in 2021.

History

The idea for the racing series came from discussions between Aurélio Batista Félix, a truck driver from Santos, and Portuguese journalist Francisco Santos.

The first race took place on 6 September 1987 at the Autodromo Internacional de Cascavel circuit in Paraná. The contest involved 35 competitors and was named I Copa Brasil de Caminhões ("First Brazilian Trucks' Cup"). It served as a trial contest to ascertain the safety of the new type of racing. However, there was a fatal accident involving one of the participants; Jeferson Ribeiro da Fonseca, a driver who was also the president of Autodromo Internacional de Cascavel. Jeferson Ribeiro's death had a profound impact and led to Francisco Santos leaving Fórmula Truck three years later.

In 1994, a new event for truck drivers and businessmen was created, with safety as a top priority, at the Interlagos circuit in São Paulo. The contest begun in 1995, and the four trial races were held in the cities of Cascavel and Londrina (PR), Tarumã (RS) and Goiânia (GO). In Goiânia, over 120,000 people attended the event.

The first championship with defined rules took place in 1996 and was approved by the Confederação Brasileira de Automobilismo (Brazilian Automobile Confederation). The first official competition took place in Guaporé (RS) and had 13 trucks on the grid.

On 5 March 2008, the creator of Formula Truck, Aurélio Batista Félix, died of a stomach haemorrhage. He had heart problems and suffered a heart attack during the first stage of the 2008 season, which was being held in Guaporé.

In 2010, the organisation announced a South American championship, and Roberval Andrade was crowned champion. In 2011, three races were announced for the South American Championship.

Organization

The qualifying session that decides the starting grid is held the Saturday before the race. Each driver can have a warm-up lap, three timed laps and a slowdown lap. If he gives up, he is entitled to a single attempt at the end of training.

In Formula Truck, the number of laps in each race is determined by the length and conditions of the racetrack, and usually ranges from 30-35 laps. During the Ceará race, which occurred in 2006, the number of laps was 60, due to the length of the track. Any laps completed with a pace truck are considered invalid. In restarts, pairing of the trucks is stopped and overtaking is allowed only after the checkered flag, or when the green light is lit.

In 2006, when the 12th lap is valid, the pilots will receive a chequered flag in green and yellow, which scores the first five places. At this point, the Pace Truck enters the track and neutralises the race for cleaning and removing vehicles on the track, remaining for three to five laps. After restart, trucks complete the preset number of laps and make the podium in accordance with their respective classification in the race or with less time penalties if applicable.

The trucks have enough power to exceed 200 km/h, but at one point in the circuit there is a speed limit of 160 km/h, to ensure sufficient safety. Adherence to this safety limit is monitored with the help of radars installed at varied points around the track.

Scoring system

Champions

Brazilian

South American

End
In 2017, several teams left the organisation to create a new championship called Copa Truck. After two rounds of the 2017 season, partners and drivers forced the postponement of the third race twice due to the lack of audience. After that, an announcement on the website of the organisation stated that the 2017 season was cancelled and that they would attempt to return in 2018.

Finally, in November 2020 it was announced that Formula Truck would return under new management for the 2021 season.

See also 

 Brazilian Automobile Confederation

References

External links

 Official website of the Fórmula Truck (in Portuguese) - 

 
1996 establishments in Brazil
2017 disestablishments in Brazil
Motorsport competitions in Brazil